This is a record of the results of the Mexico national football team at the FIFA World Cup. The World Cup is the premier competitive international football tournament, first played in 1930, and then every four years since, except 1942 and 1946, due to World War II.

Mexico has competed in the tournament since the inaugural 1930 World Cup, and has entered ever since, for a total of 16 tournaments, although it has failed to qualify for the finals proper on 3 occasions: 1934 (Italy), 1974 (West Germany), and 1982 (Spain). In addition, it withdrew from the finals in 1938 (France), and was banned by FIFA from entering the 1990 World Cup (Italy) after fielding over-aged players during the 1988 Olympic Games qualifiers, which was a youth tournament.

The tournament consists of two parts, the qualification phase and the final phase (officially called the World Cup Finals). The qualification phase, which currently take place over the three years preceding the Finals, is used to determine which teams qualify for the Finals. The current format of the Finals involves 32 teams competing for the title, at venues within the host nation (or nations) over a period of about a month. The World Cup Finals is the most widely viewed sporting event in the world, with an estimated 715.1 million people watching the 2006 tournament final.

Overall record

By match

Record players

Top goalscorers

References

External links
 FIFA Official Ranking of all Participants at Finals 1930–2002. FIFA Match Results for all Stages 1930–2002
FIFA World Cup History 

 
Countries at the FIFA World Cup